The 1968 Florida State Seminoles football team represented Florida State University in the 1968 NCAA University Division football season. This was Bill Peterson's ninth year as head coach, and he led the team to an 8–3 record.

Schedule

Roster

Season summary

Wake Forest
Bill Cappleman 22/33, 365 Yds (set school single season passing yards and attempts records)
Ron Sellers 14 Rec, 260 Yds (set NCAA career receiving yards record and school records for TD receptions in a game, TD receptions in a career and points in a career)

References

Florida State
Florida State Seminoles football seasons
Florida State Seminoles football